This list identifies various pieces of body armour worn from the medieval to early modern period in the Western world, mostly plate but some mail armour, arranged by the part of body that is protected and roughly by date. It does not identify fastening components or various appendages such as lance rests or plumeholders, or clothing such as tabards or surcoats, which were often worn over a harness.

There are a variety of alternative names and spellings (such as cowter or couter; bassinet, bascinet or basinet; and besagew or besague) which often reflect a word introduced from French.  Generally, the English spelling has been preferred (including mail instead of the lately used maille or the inauthentic term chainmail). The part of armour on the hand is called the gauntlet, which is based on a French word.

Japanese analogues

The following components of Japanese armour roughly match the position and function of certain components of occidental armour:

 Kusari zukin (mail coif)
 Mengu (mask)
 Kabuto (helmet)
 Dō (cuirass)
 Kote (vambrace and lower pauldron)
 Han kote (gauntlet)
 Sode (roughly pauldron)
 Suneate (greave)
 Kusazuri (fauld or tasset)
 Wakibiki (bezagews)
 Nodowa (gorget)
 Kusari katabira (hauberk)
 Kikko katabira (brigandine)
 Kôgake (sabaton)
 Kusari shikoro (aventail)

Medieval armour
Body armor
Western plate armour
Medieval armour